Van Spaendonck is a Dutch surname. Notable people with the surname include:

 Cornelis van Spaendonck (1756–1839), Dutch painter, brother of Gerard
 Gerard van Spaendonck (1746–1822), Dutch painter

Surnames of Dutch origin